Kjølsdalen is a village in the municipality of Stad in Vestland county, Norway. The village is named after the Kjølsdalen valley in which it is located.

Historically, Kjølsdalen was administratively part of the old municipality of Davik until 1964 when it became part of Eid municipality. In 2020, Eid Municipality became Stad Municipality. Kjølsdalen Church is located in the village, serving the western part of the municipality of Eid.

References

Villages in Vestland
Stad, Norway